This is a list of films produced in Taiwan ordered by year of release. For an alphabetical list of Taiwanese films see :Category:Taiwanese films

1990

1991

1992

1993

1994

1995

1996

1997

1998

1999

References

External links
 Taiwanese film at the Internet Movie Database

1990s
1990s in Taiwan
Taiwan